The Bean-Newlee House, at 1045 5th St. in Las Vegas, New Mexico, was built around 1905.  It was listed on the National Register of Historic Places in 1985.

It is a stuccoed hipped roof house.  It has American Foursquare massing but is deemed Mission/Spanish Revival overall in its style.  The house was home in 1912 to P.A. Bean, a civil engineer, and to B.H. Newlee, another civil engineer, and his wife.

References

National Register of Historic Places in San Miguel County, New Mexico
Mission Revival architecture in New Mexico
Houses completed in 1905
1905 establishments in New Mexico Territory